Metamorfosis is the 12th studio album of Puerto Rican singer Ednita Nazario. It was released in 1992 and was nominated for Pop Album of the Year at the 6th Lo Nuestro Awards.

Track listing
 "Mírame"
 "Metamorfosis"
 "La Cantante"
 "Un Corazón Hecho Pedazos"
 "Te Quedas En Mi"
 "Tres Deseos"
 "Tanto Nos Amamos"
 "Y Te Vas"
 "Un Hombre Para Mí"

Singles
 "Tanto Nos Amamos"
 "Mírame"
 "Tres Deseos"
 "Y Te Vas"
 "Un Corazón Hecho Pedazos"
 "Metamorfosis"

Chart performance

Personnel
 Produced by Ednita Nazario and K. C. Porter

References

1992 albums
Ednita Nazario albums
Spanish-language albums